Wilson Sabiya (January 12, 1938 – March 30, 2004) was Governor of Adamawa State, Nigeria from 27 August 1991 to January 1992. He was also the first governor of the state.

References

1938 births
2004 deaths
Governors of Adamawa State